Marina Timofeyevna Semyonova (– 9 June 2010) was the first Soviet-trained prima ballerina. She was born in Saint-Petersburg. She was named a People's Artist of the USSR in 1975.

Early life
The first great dancer formed by Agrippina Vaganova, she graduated from the Vaganova School in 1925, which "is registered in the annals of Soviet ballet as the year of the unprecedented triumph of Marina Semyonova".

She worked in the Kirov Ballet until 1930 when Joseph Stalin had her and her husband Viktor Semyonov (they were namesakes) transferred to the Bolshoi Theatre in Moscow.

There she married Lev Karakhan (the civil marriage), an Old Bolshevik and Deputy Foreign Minister, best known as an advisor to Sun Yat-sen. He was purged in 1937.

Career
The Soviet choreographer Maya Plisetskaya wrote of her that "what she demonstrated in her time was unusual, brand new, breathtaking. Now it is widely believed it has always been that way." The writer Stefan Zweig wrote of her dancing that "when she steps onto the stage with her nature-given gait, which her training only polished, and suddenly soars up in a wild leap, the impression is that of a storm suddenly splitting the quiet of a humdrum existence."

Semyonova was guest with the Paris Opéra Ballet in 1935 where she danced Giselle with Serge Lifar.

She received the Stalin Prize for 1941 and retired in 1952. After that, she became one of the most important teachers and répétiteurs of the Bolshoi Theatre. Natalia Bessmertnova, Marina Kondratieva, Nadezhda Pavlova, Nina Sorokina, Ludmila Semenyaka, Nina Timofeyeva and Nina Ananiashvili were among her adepts.

Semyonova retired from her coaching duties at the age of 96. She is known for her friendship with young danseur Nikolay Tsiskaridze, who interviewed her on several occasions. She also had a daughter by elocutionist Vsevolod Aksyonov. In 2003, she won the Prix Benois de la Danse for lifetime achievement.
In 2008, the Bolshoi Theatre celebrated Semyonova's centenary. Semyonova died on 9 June 2010 in her home in Moscow, three days before her 102nd birthday.

See also
List of Russian ballet dancers

Notes

Further reading
M.T. Semyonova. Moscow, 1953.
S. Ivanova. Marina Semyonova. Moscow, 1965.

External links
 Semyonova  performs Odette variation from act II of Tchaikovsky's Swan Lake in 1940
 Biography
 Biography
 Biography

1908 births
2010 deaths
Prima ballerina assolutas
Prima ballerinas
Russian ballerinas
People's Artists of the USSR
Russian centenarians
Prix Benois de la Danse winners
Soviet ballerinas
Vaganova graduates
Ballet teachers
20th-century Russian ballet dancers
Women centenarians